The Keys of Heaven, also called Saint Peter's keys, refers to the metaphorical keys of the office of Saint Peter, the keys of Heaven, or the keys of the kingdom of Heaven. It is explicitly referenced in the Bible in Matthew 16:19.

In Catholicism 

According to Catholic teaching, Jesus promised the keys to heaven to Saint Peter, empowering him to take binding actions. In the Gospel of Matthew 16:19, Jesus says to Peter, "I will give you the keys of the kingdom of heaven, and whatever you bind on Earth shall be bound in heaven, and whatever you loose on Earth shall be loosed in heaven." Saint Peter is often depicted in Catholic and Eastern Orthodox paintings and other artwork as holding a key or a set of keys.

The keys of heaven or keys of Saint Peter are seen as a symbol of papal authority and are seen on papal coats of arms (those of individual popes) and those of the Holy See and Vatican City State: "Behold he [Peter] received the keys of the kingdom of heaven, the power of binding and loosing is committed to him, the care of the whole Church and its government is given to him".

Biblical sources 
Bible verses associated with Peter and his position of authority include: 

 Isaiah 22:20–23; 
 Matthew 10:2; 
 Matthew 16:18–19; 
 Luke 22:32; 
 John 21:17; 
 Acts 2:14; 
 Acts 10:46; and 
 Galatians 1:18.

Bible verses associated with the transfer of powers from pope to pope include: 

 Acts 1:20; 6:6; 13:3; 8:18; 9:17; 1 
 Timothy 4:14; 5:22; 2 
 Timothy 1:6.

Symbols depicting the Keys of Heaven

In Catholicism

Elsewhere

See also 

 Coats of arms of the Holy See and Vatican City
 Keys of the kingdom
 Papal regalia and insignia
 Power of the Keys
 Primacy of Peter

References

Further reading 

Catholic Answers Magazine: Peter's Authority
Catechism of the Catholic Church (Paragraphs 880–883)

External links 

Biblical phrases
Christian terminology
Holy See
Vatican heraldry
Christian symbols
Catholic heraldry
Heaven in Christianity